These are the official line ups for the 2019 ASEAN Grand Prix.

First Leg

The following is the Indonesian roster in the 2019 ASEAN Grand Prix - First Leg.

Head Coach: Oktavian

The following is the Filipino roster in the 2019 ASEAN Grand Prix - First Leg.

Head Coach: Shaq Delos Santos

The following is the Thai roster in the 2019 ASEAN Grand Prix - First Leg.

Head Coach: Danai Sriwatcharamethakul

The following 14 players of Vietnam in the 2019 ASEAN Grand Prix - First Leg.

Head Coach: Nguyễn Tuấn Kiệt

References

2019 in volleyball